Abortion in Nevada is legal within 24 weeks since fertilization, under the Nevada Revised Statutes chapter 442, section 250; and after 24 weeks if the pregnancy could be fatal for the pregnant woman. 62% of adults said in a poll by the Pew Research Center that abortion should be legal while 34% said it should by illegal in all or most cases. Legislation by 2007 required informed consent. Attempts were successfully made to pass abortion legislation in May 2019, being pushed through a largely Democratic controlled state legislature. The number of abortion clinics in Nevada has declined over the years, with 25 in 1982, seventeen in 1992 and thirteen in 2014. There were 8,132 legal abortions in 2014, and 7,116 in 2015.

State funding could be used to fund abortions in case of risk of life to the mother, rape or incest but no such funding was used in 2010. There are active abortion rights and anti-abortion rights activists in the state.

History

Legislative history 
In 1990, Nevada voters approved Question 7 to affirm statute Nevada Revised Statutes Chapter 442, section 250 (which permits abortion up to 24 weeks gestation) by 63.5 percent of the vote. With the affirmation, the Nevada Legislature may not in any way alter that statute, unless it is first repealed by the state voters in a direct vote.

The state was one of 10 states in 2007 to have a customary informed consent provision for abortions. In August 2018, the state had a law to protect the right to have an abortion.

As of May 14, 2019, the state prohibited abortions after the fetus was viable, generally some point between week 24 and 28. This period uses a standard defined by the US Supreme Court in 1973 with the Roe v. Wade ruling. Florida, Nevada, and New York had laws prohibiting abortions after 24 weeks. This law was still in place as of mid-May 2019. The law also required that abortions be done by licensed physicians. In situations where abortions take place after 24 weeks, the law said that the procedure needed to take place at a licensed hospital.

SB 179, which would decriminalize medicated abortions, was scheduled to be voted on in late May 2019. It passed the House 27–13, with only one Democrat voting against it.  Other revisions under the new law in May 2019 included abortion providers not longer needing to tell women of the "emotional implications" of having an abortion. Trust Nevada Women Act, SB 179, was signed into law by Democratic Governor Steve Sisolak on May 31, 2019. In signing the bill, he said, "Nevada has a long history of trusting the women of our state to make their own reproductive health care decisions and protecting the right to reproductive freedom." The new law made several changes to existing abortion laws in the state, including decriminalizing the performing of abortion procedures, and removing informed consent laws that said doctors needed to tell women of the "emotional implications" in having an abortion and what women should do after the procedure to avoid post-op complications; the latter was changed to require doctors to "describe the nature and consequences of the procedure" of abortion to women getting abortions. The law also meant doctors no longer had to collect data about women getting abortions related to their marital status and age. In addition, Senate Bill 94 allocated $6 million to be spent statewide for grants to family planning organizations.

Judicial history 
The US Supreme Court's decision in 1973's Roe v. Wade ruling meant the state could no longer regulate abortion in the first trimester. However, the Supreme Court overturned Roe v. Wade in Dobbs v. Jackson Women's Health Organization,  later in 2022.

Clinic history 

Between 1982 and 1992, the number of abortion clinics in the state decreased by eight, going from 25 in 1982 to 17 in 1992. In 2014, the state had thirteen facilities that provided abortions, of which eight were abortion clinics. In 2014, 88% of the counties in the state did not have an abortion clinic. That year, 9% of women in the state aged 15–44 lived in a county without an abortion clinic. In 2017, there were three Planned Parenthood clinics, of which two offered abortion services, in a state with a population of 668,173 women aged 15–49.

Statistics 
In 1990, 149,000 women in the state faced the risk of an unintended pregnancy. Between 2011 and 2014, the state saw a decrease of 6% in the number of abortions performed in the state. In 2014, 62% of adults said in a poll by the Pew Research Center that abortion should be legal while 34% said it should be illegal in all or most cases. In 2017, the state had an infant mortality rate of 5.8 deaths per 1,000 live births.

Abortion financing 
In 2010, the state had zero publicly funded abortions. The law as of May 1, 2018, said that potential danger to the life of the mother, pregnancy as a result of rape or incest were the only reasons that state funding could be used by women seeking abortions.

SB 94 was passed in June 2019 in the final days of the legislative session. US$6 million was allocated as part of the bill to fund reproductive assistance measures in the state through family planning grants.  Money could be used by eligible organizations for a wide variety of uses including immunizations, birth control, emergency contraception, and male sterilization surgery. It did not cover abortions. This money was intended to assist low income women and women living in largely rural areas.

Abortion rights views and activities

Protests 
Women from the state participated in marches supporting abortion rights as part of a #StoptheBans movement in May 2019.

Abortion rights protesters were at the Nevada Capitol Building with signs to support the passage of SB 179, including pink signs that said "protect safe, legal abortion".

Views 
Legislation co-sponsor Democratic Senator Yvanna Cancela said of the SB 94's passage, "When the rest of the country may feel hopeless, may feel bleak, they should look to Nevada as the shining beacon that we are for women's rights."

Anti-abortion views and activities

Views 
Following the passage of the May 2019 legislation SB 94, Republican Assemblywoman Alexis Hansen said, "This bill is a slippery slope that (will) leave women and children less informed and more susceptible to exploitation."

Violence 
Rachelle "Shelley" Shannon attempted to set fires at abortion clinics in Oregon, California, Idaho and Nevada during the late 1980s and early 1990s and eventually pleaded guilty for these cases of arson.  In 1993, she was found guilty of the attempted murder of George Tiller in 1993 at his Wichita, Kansas clinic.

References 

Nevada
Healthcare in Nevada
Women in Nevada